Foreland may refer to:
 a landform projecting into the sea, such as a headland or a promontory
 an area of land in front of something
Foreland basin, in geology, the zone that receives sediment from an adjacent mountain chain
Glacier foreland, the area between the leading edge of a glacier and the moraines of the last maximum

Places 
 Foreland, Isle of Wight, a promontory on the Isle of Wight in England
 Foreland Island in the South Shetland Islands, Antarctica
 Foreland Point, a headland in Devon, England
 Alpine Foreland, a region in Southern Germany
 North and South Foreland, two headlands on the coast of Kent, England

See also 
 Nils Tore Føreland (born 1957), Norwegian politician